Hassan Taïr (born 12 December 1982) is a Moroccan footballer who plays for Al-Raed as a forward.

Honours

Raja Casablanca
Botola: 2009, 2011

Individual
Top scorer of the 2005-06 Moroccan Second Division with 16 goals.

References

External links
Soccerpunter.com Profile
Ultrasclub.com Profile

1982 births
Living people
Moroccan footballers
Moroccan expatriate footballers
Morocco international footballers
Raja CA players
Emirates Club players
Al-Shoulla FC players
Al-Raed FC players
Expatriate footballers in Saudi Arabia
RS Berkane players
Saudi Professional League players
UAE Pro League players
Association football forwards